Opisthotropis kuatunensis, the Chinese mountain keelback,  is a species of natricine snake found in China.

References

Opisthotropis
Reptiles described in 1928
Reptiles of China
Taxa named by Clifford H. Pope